is the first compilation album by Japanese entertainer Miho Nakayama. Released through King Records on November 15, 1987, the album compiles Nakayama's singles from 1985 to 1987. "C" and "Tsuiteru ne Notteru ne" were the album versions on initial releases of this album; they were replaced with single versions on the 2006 reissue.

The album became Nakayama's first to hit No. 1 on Oricon's albums chart. It sold over 542,000 copies, becoming her biggest selling album until Collection III in 1995.

Track listing

Charts
Weekly charts

Year-end charts

References

External links
 
 
 

1987 compilation albums
Miho Nakayama compilation albums
Japanese-language compilation albums
King Records (Japan) compilation albums